Ross Minter (born 10 November 1978) is a former professional boxer. He is the son of Alan Minter, the former undisputed World Middleweight Champion.

Ross "The Boss" won 125 amateur boxing matches before turning professional in 2001 at the age of 21. After a debut win against Brian Coleman in 2001, Minter went on to record 17 wins, 1 draw, 1 defeat by the end of 2005, winning the British Boxing Board of Control English Welterweight boxing title on December 12, 2005. In 2007 Minter starred in the television Contender Challenge: United Kingdom vs. United States on ITV4, also on ESPN.

Minter retired as a fighter in 2008 and later became boxing promoter.

In the past, Minter has supported the Advance Centre for The Scotson Technique (TST) charity from East Grinstead.

References

External links
Ross Minter boxing record on Boxrec

1978 births
Living people
Sportspeople from Crawley
Welterweight boxers
Prizefighter contestants
English male boxers